Who Knows Where the Time Goes is the seventh studio album by American singer and songwriter Judy Collins, released by Elektra Records in 1968. It peaked at No. 29 on the Billboard 200 charts.

The album was recorded live in the studio and was Collins' first studio album to be recorded in Los Angeles. Produced by David Anderle, the album features numerous well-known musicians, including Stephen Stills (credited as "Steven Stills"). The songs include her own composition "My Father", Ian Tyson's "Someday Soon" (which would go on to become one of Collins' signature songs), two Leonard Cohen compositions ("Story of Isaac" and "Bird on the Wire"), the traditional murder ballad "Pretty Polly", and the title song, "Who Knows Where the Time Goes", composed by Sandy Denny.

Two versions of the song "Who Knows Where the Time Goes" were released. Version 1 with only vocal, two guitars, and bass appeared on the B-side of "Both Sides Now", on the soundtrack to the 1968 film The Subject Was Roses, and on the compilation album Colors of the Day. Version 2 is a composite: the first verse is the same take as version 1, but with everything remixed to the left channel, then crossfading to a different recording with a larger arrangement, modulated to a different key. Version 2 appears on the album.

Collins' cover of Joni Mitchell's "Chelsea Morning" was recorded during the Who Knows Where the Time Goes sessions, but not included on the album; however, a single release of the song, with "Pretty Polly" as the B-side, charted in August 1969.

"Hello, Hooray", written by Canadian singer-songwriter Rolf Kempf, was later covered as the opening track on Alice Cooper's 1973 album Billion Dollar Babies.

In 1969, the album was certified Gold by the RIAA for sales of over 500,000 copies in the US.

Track listing
Side one
 "Hello, Hooray" (Rolf Kempf) – 4:07
 "Story of Isaac" (Leonard Cohen) – 3:30
 "My Father" (Judy Collins) – 4:55
 "Someday Soon" (Ian Tyson) – 3:43
 "Who Knows Where the Time Goes" (Sandy Denny) – 4:20

Side two
 "I Pity the Poor Immigrant" (Bob Dylan) – 4:04
 "First Boy I Loved" (Robin Williamson) – 7:29
 "Bird on the Wire" (Cohen) – 4:37
 "Pretty Polly" (Traditional; arranged and adapted by Judy Collins and Michael Sahl) – 5:47

Personnel
 Judy Collins – acoustic guitar (tracks 1, 4–9), electric piano (track 3), vocals

Additional musicians
 Michael Sahl – organ (tracks 1–2, 6, 9), harpsichord (track 2), piano (tracks 5, 7–8)
 Steven Stills – electric guitar (tracks 1, 3, 5, 7, 9), electric bass guitar (tracks 4, 6), acoustic guitar (track 5)
 Chris Ethridge – electric bass guitar (tracks 1, 3, 5, 7–9)
 James Gordon – drums (tracks 1, 4–9), percussion (track 3)
 Michael Melvoin – piano (track 3)
 James Burton – electric guitar (track 4, 6, 8–9), dobro (track 6) 
 Buddy Emmons – pedal steel guitar (tracks 4, 6, 8–9)
 Van Dyke Parks – piano (track 4), electric piano (track 9)

Technical
 David Anderle – producer
 Jac Holzman – production supervisor
 John Haeny – engineer
 Len Steckler – cover photos
 Julie Snow – inside photo
 William S. Harvey – art direction, cover design

References

1968 albums
Judy Collins albums
Albums produced by David Anderle
Elektra Records albums